Peers may refer to:

People
 Donald Peers
 Edgar Allison Peers, English academician
 Gavin Peers
 John Peers, Australian tennis player
 Kerry Peers
 Mark Peers
 Michael Peers
 Steve Peers
 Teddy Peers (1886–1935), Welsh international footballer
 Ted Peers (footballer) (1873–1905), English footballer
 William R. Peers, American general who investigated the My Lai Massacre (Vietnam war)

Places
 Peers, Alberta, a hamlet in Alberta, Canada
 Peers, Missouri, a community in the United States

See also 
 Peer (disambiguation)
 Pears (disambiguation)
 Peerage
 Chamber of Peers (disambiguation)
 Piers (disambiguation)

Surnames from given names